Glam Fairy is an American reality television series on the Style Network that premiered on October 23, 2011. A spinoff to Jerseylicious, the series follows Alexa Prisco as she uses her New Jersey style to provide women with makeovers.

Cast

Alexa Prisco: "The Glam Fairy"
Jon Kuuiiitlu: "The Right-Hand Fairy"
Briella Calafiore: "The Dramalicious Fairy"
Sharie Manon: "The Sexy, Confident Fairy"
Alexa aka A2: "The Glam Fairy in Training"
Glamo: "The Resident Stylist"
Jessica Romano: "The Ditzy Fairy"
Danny Ziegler: Alexa's fiancé
Victoria Doroshenko

Episodes

Season 1 (2011-2012)

Season 2 (2012)

References

2010s American reality television series
2011 American television series debuts
2012 American television series endings
English-language television shows
American television spin-offs
Style Network original programming
Reality television spin-offs